Jaws 3-D (titled Jaws III in its 2-D form) is a 1983 American thriller film directed by Joe Alves and starring Dennis Quaid, Bess Armstrong, Lea Thompson and Louis Gossett Jr. It is the second sequel to Steven Spielberg's Jaws and the third installment in the Jaws franchise. The film follows the Brody children from the previous films to SeaWorld, a Florida marine park with underwater tunnels and lagoons. As the park prepares for opening, a young great white shark infiltrates the park from the sea, seemingly attacking and killing the park's employees. Once the shark is captured, it becomes apparent that a second, much larger shark also entered the park and was the real culprit.

The film made use of 3D during the revived interest in the technology in the 1980s, amongst other horror films such as Friday the 13th Part III and Amityville 3-D. Cinema audiences could wear disposable cardboard polarized 3D glasses to create the illusion that elements penetrate the screen. Several shots and sequences were designed to utilize the effect, such as the shark's destruction. Since 3D was ineffective in home viewing until the advent of 3D televisions in the late 2000s, the alternative title Jaws III is used for television broadcasts and home media. Despite commercial success, Jaws 3-D received overwhelmingly negative reviews and was followed by Jaws: The Revenge in 1987; which retroactively ignores this film.

Plot

Michael "Mike" Brody, son of police chief Martin Brody of Amity, Massachusetts, is working as chief engineer at SeaWorld Orlando alongside his girlfriend, Kathryn "Kay" Morgan, the park's senior biologist. Among the attractions are new underwater tunnels that allow for a view of the undersea life.  While the park's lagoon gates are stuck open, a great white shark follows an unsuspecting team of water skiers into the park. Kay and her assistants notice that the resident dolphins, especially two individuals Cindy and Sandy, are afraid of leaving their pen and going out into the lagoon. Later, Calvin Bouchard, the park manager, welcomes his friend, adventurer and hunter Philip FitzRoyce, and Mike's brother Sean arrives for a visit. That night, Shelby Overman, a mechanic, dives into the water to repair and secure the gates. He is attacked by the shark and killed, severing his right arm. Mike, Kay and Sean go out for drinks and Sean meets and begins dating Kelly Ann Bukowski, one of the park's water skiers. Meanwhile, two men sneak into the park and go underwater to steal coral they intend to sell, but both are killed by the shark in the process.

The next day, Kay and Mike are informed of Overman's disappearance. The dolphins rescue Kay and Mike, but the shark escapes back into the park. They inform Bouchard, and FitzRoyce suggests killing the shark on network television. Kay protests, instead recommending capturing the shark and keeping it alive in captivity, which would generate more publicity for the park. The shark is successfully captured, and Kay and her staff begin to nurse it to health. Calvin, desperate to start the money rolling in immediately, orders it moved to an exhibit, but the shark dies. Kelly cajoles Sean out onto the water in a bumper boat, despite his trepidation due to his experiences in Amity.

She is able to convince Calvin about this newest development when the shark herself shows up at the window of the underwater café. Flushed out from her refuge inside a filtration pipe, the shark begins to wreak havoc on the park, injuring Kelly, and causing a leak that nearly drowns everyone in the underwater tunnel. FitzRoyce and his assistant, Jack Tate, go down to the filtration pipe in an attempt to lure the shark back in as a trap to kill it. As Jack closes the pipe's gate, FitzRoyce successfully leads the shark into the pipe, but his tether rope suddenly snaps due to the strong current generated by its pumps. Trapped inside the pipe and unable to reach the ladder to the exit hatch, he decides to kill the shark with a bang stick to no effect. The shark proceeds to eat him whole before he can pull the pin from his grenade and kills him.

Hearing that the shark has been lured into the pipe, Mike and Kay go down to repair the underwater tunnel, so the technicians can restore air pressure and drain the water. Calvin orders the pumps to be shut down to suffocate the shark, but this act instead allows it to break free from the pipe and attack Mike and Kay, but they are again saved by the dolphins. They make their way back to the control room and the civilians in the underwater tunnel are safely evacuated. The shark suddenly appears in front of the window and smashes through the glass, flooding the control room and killing a technician. Mike notices FitzRoyce's corpse still in the shark's throat holding the grenade and uses a bent pole to pull its pin, triggering the grenade's explosion and killing the shark. In the aftermath, Mike and Kay celebrate with the dolphins, who survived their battle with the shark.

Cast
Dennis Quaid as Mike Brody
Bess Armstrong as Kathryn Morgan
Simon MacCorkindale as Philip FitzRoyce
Louis Gossett Jr. as Calvin Bouchard
John Putch as Sean Brody
Lea Thompson as Kelly Ann Bukowski
P. H. Moriarty as Jack Tate
Dan Blasko as Danny
Liz Morris as Liz 
Harry Grant as Shelby Overman
Lisa Maurer as Ethal 
Kaye Stevens as Mrs. Kellender

Production

Development and writing
David Brown and Richard Zanuck, the producers for the first two films, originally pitched the second Jaws sequel as a spoof named Jaws 3, People 0. Matty Simmons, fresh off the success of National Lampoon's Animal House, was brought in as producer, with Brown and Zanuck taking on executive producer roles. Simmons outlined a story and commissioned National Lampoon writers John Hughes and Todd Carroll for a script. Joe Dante was briefly pursued as a director. The project was shut down due to conflicts with Universal Studios. David Brown later said that the studio attitude was that a spoof would have been a mistake and that it would be like "fouling in your own nest. We should have fouled the nest. It would have been golden, maybe even platinum."

Alan Landsburg bought the rights to produce the film. He attempted to involve experimental filmmaker Murray Lerner in Jaws 3, telling him that people at the Marineland theme park in Florida had seen his 1978 3D film Sea Dream. Lerner said that his "heart sank" when he was sent the first script of Jaws 3-D, saying, "I can't really get involved in this". As the production already had an art director, Lerner, who didn't like the script, declined to be involved in the film.

The film was directed by Joe Alves, who was the production designer for the first two films and was the second unit director for Jaws 2. It had been suggested that Alves co-direct the first sequel with Verna Fields when first director John D. Hancock left the project. It was filmed at SeaWorld Orlando, a marine zoological park ; and Navarre, Florida, a community in the Florida Panhandle near Pensacola.

As with the first two films in the series, many people were involved in writing the film. Richard Matheson, who had written the script for Steven Spielberg's 1971 television film Duel, says that he wrote a "very interesting" outline, although the story is credited to "some other writer". Universal forced Matheson to include Brody's two sons, which the writer "thought was dumb". They also wanted it to be the same shark that was electrocuted in Jaws 2. Matheson was also requested to write a role specifically for Mickey Rooney, saying that "when Mickey Rooney turned out not to be available, the whole part was pointless". The writer was unhappy with the finished film.

I'm a good storyteller and I wrote a good outline and a good script. And if they had done it right and if it had been directed by somebody who knew how to direct, I think it would have been an excellent movie. Jaws 3-D was the only thing Joe Alves ever directed; the man is a very skilled production designer, but as a director, no. And the so-called 3D just made the film look murky  – it had no effect whatsoever. It was a waste of time.

Guerdon Trueblood is credited for the story; a reviewer for the website SciFilm says that the screenplay was based upon Trueblood's story about a white shark swimming upstream and becoming trapped in a lake. Carl Gottlieb, who had also revised the screenplays for the first two Jaws films, was credited for the script alongside Richard Matheson. Matheson has reported in interviews that the screenplay was revised by script doctors. Alves said in an interview in June 2020 that approximately 20 minutes of footage were cut from the final film due to Landsburg's insistence.

Casting
The film did not use any actors from the first two Jaws films. Roy Scheider, who played Police Chief Martin Brody in the first two films, laughed at the thought of Jaws 3, saying that "Mephistopheles ... couldn't talk me into doing [it] ... They knew better than to even ask". He agreed to do the film Blue Thunder to ensure his unavailability for Jaws 3-D.

Dennis Quaid stated in a 2015 interview that, of all his films, he made the most aggressive use of cocaine during the filming of Jaws 3D, and that he was high on the drug in "every frame" in which he appears.

3D
There was a revival in popularity of 3D at this time, with many films using the technique. Jaws second sequel integrated the technology into its title, as did Amityville 3D. Friday the 13th Part III could also make dual use of the number three. The gimmick was also advertised in the tagline "the third dimension is terror." As it was Joe Alves' first film as director, he thought that 3D would "give him an edge".

Cinema audiences could wear disposable polarized glasses to view the film, creating the illusion that elements from the film were penetrating the screen to come towards the viewers. The opening sequence makes obvious use of the technique, with the titles flying to the forefront of the screen, leaving a trail. There are more subtle instances in the film where props are meant to leave the screen. The more obvious examples are in the climactic sequence of the shark attacking the control room and its subsequent destruction. The glass as the shark smashes into the room uses 3D, as does the shot where the shark explodes, with fragmented parts of it apparently bursting through the screen, ending with its jaws. There were many difficulties in making the blue screen compositing work in 3D, and a lot of material had to be reshot.

Jaws 3-D had two 3D consultants: the production started with Chris Condon, president of StereoVision, and Stan Loth was later added to the team for the ArriVision 3D. Production began using the StereoVision, but this was dropped after a week for the ArriVision system, "which Alves believed was a superior system because it has a wider variety of lenses". According to Alves, inferior systems lead to ghosting and blurring, leaving audiences with headaches. He says that "the left and right images [in Jaws 3-D] are very well-matched, and the photography is very clean; it's restful to the eye, and though we do have the occasional effects where things do emerge toward the audience from the plane of projection, you come out of the film without a headache." Historian R. M. Hayes says that the film was shot using both the Arrivision and StereoVision single strip-over-and-under units. Both cameras were used in conjunction with each other. This is a means of shooting 3D movies in normal color with a single camera and single strip of film: the Arrivision 3D technique uses a special twin-lens adapter fitted to the film camera, and divides the 35 mm film frame in half along the middle, capturing the left-eye image in the upper half of the frame and the right-eye image in the lower half, a technique known as "over/under". This allows filming to proceed as for any standard 2D film, without the considerable additional expense of having to double up on cameras and film stock for every shot. When the resultant film is projected through a normal projector (albeit one requiring a special lens that combines the upper and lower images), a true polarized 3D image is produced. This system allows 3D films to be shown in almost any cinema since it does not require two projectors running simultaneously through the presentation ⁠— something most cinemas are not equipped to handle. What is required of the theatre is both the special projection lens and a reflective "silver" screen to enable the polarized images to reflect back to the viewer with the appropriate filter on each eye blocking out the wrong image, thus leaving the viewer to see the film from two angles as the eyes naturally see the world. According to the company that built the underwater camera housings for Jaws 3-D, the underwater sequences were shot using an Arriflex 35–3 camera with Arrivision 18 mm over/under 3D lens.

This kind of 3D effect does not work on television without special electronic hardware at the viewer's end, and so with two exceptions, the home video and broadcast TV versions of Jaws 3-D were created using just the left-eye image, and with the title changed to Jaws 3 or Jaws III. Because the left-eye image only takes up half the 35 mm film frame, the picture resolution is noticeably poorer than would normally be expected of a film shot on 35 mm.

One of the exceptions was a 1986 release of the film for the now-obsolete Video High Density (VHD) video disc system. This required a special 3D VHD player, or a standard VHD player with a hardware 3D adapter, and a set of LCD glasses that shuttered the viewer's eyes according to control signals sent by the player, allowing the polarized 3D effect to work. The other exception was the Sensio 3D DVD of Jaws 3-D released in February 2008. The Sensio 3D Processor is needed for 3D home viewing.

Surya Citra Televisi in Indonesian nationwide free-to-air terrestrial television station the 3D version of the film on HD by Friday, 30 September 1994 at 19:30 to 22:00 WIB a member of Bimantara Citra and Sindo Citra Media, STAR TV Xing Kong (Mainland China) in Mandarin Chinese satellite television broadcast on CCTV New Year's Gala 2012 at 21:30 to 23:30 CST and TVB Pearl in Hong Kong English nationwide free-to-air terrestrial television station on Sunday, 3 July 2016 at 21:30 to 23:40 Hong Kong Time before News Roundup programme. The event was advertised heavily and required viewers to buy or obtain a pair of anaglyph glasses to fully enjoy the movie; this was an anaglyph 3D version of the film created from the Arrivision original.

On June 14, 2016 Universal released a Blu-ray edition of the film.  Though advertised as a 2-D release, a complete Blu-ray 3D version is included as a special feature.

Music

Soundtrack

The score was composed and conducted by Alan Parker, who had previously provided music for British television shows including Van der Valk and Minder. It was Parker's first feature score, but he would later work on What's Eating Gilbert Grape and American Gothic. John Williams' original shark motif is, however, integrated into the score. The soundtrack album was released by MCA Records which was absorbed by Geffen Records. The soundtrack was later released on CD by Intrada and was limited to only 3000 copies.

Release

Marketing
The film was heavily promoted before its wide release across the U.S. As with Jaws 2, Topps produced a series of trading cards. Television stations were encouraged to broadcast the featurette, Making of Jaws 3-D: Sharks Don't Die, in a prime-time slot between July 16 and 22, 1983 to take advantage of an advertisement in that week's issue of TV Guide. Alan Landsburg Productions found itself in trouble for using 90 seconds of footage from the National Geographic 1983 documentary film The Sharks in the featurette without authorization.

Box office
The film grossed $13,422,500 on its opening weekend, which was 1983's second highest-grossing opening weekend of the year, playing to 1,311 theaters at its widest release and accounting for 29.5% of its final gross. It has achieved total lifetime worldwide gross of $87,987,055. Despite being No. 1 at the box office, this illustrates the series' diminishing returns, since Jaws 3-D has earned nearly $100 million less than the total lifetime gross of its predecessor and $300 million less than the original film. The final sequel would attract an even lower income, with around two thirds of Jaws 3-D'''s total lifetime gross. After its opening weekend the film's box office grosses declined sharply by over 40% during later weeks, although it was still drawing huge audiences when it was pulled from theaters; film historian R.M. Hayes says this action "was pure nonsense considering some cinemas were actually turning over more money per screen than the latest Star Wars film".

Critical reception
Reception for the movie was generally negative. Variety calls it "tepid" and suggests that Alves "fails to linger long enough on the Great White." It has a 11% 'rotten' rating at Rotten Tomatoes based on 36 reviews, with an average rating of 3.5/10. Its critical consensus reads, "A cheese-soaked ocean thriller with no evident reason to exist, Jaws 3 bellows forth with a plaintive yet ultimately unheeded cry to put this franchise out of viewers' misery." Metacritic, using a weighted average, assigned the film a score of 27 out of 100 based on 9 reviews, indicating "generally unfavorable reviews." The 3D was criticized as being a gimmick to attract audiences to the aging series and for being ineffective. Allrovi, however, says that "the suspense sequences were made somewhat more memorable during the film's original release with 3D photography, an attribute lost on video, thereby removing the most distinctive element of an otherwise run-of-the-mill sequel." Derek Winnert says that "with Richard Matheson's name on the script you'd expect a better yarn" although he continues to say that the film "is entirely watchable with a big pack of popcorn." Others are disappointed that Matheson and Gottlieb produced this script given their previous success.

Although most critics are in agreement that Jaws 2 is the best of the Jaws sequels, some are unsure if Jaws 3-D is better than Jaws: The Revenge. One reviewer says of Jaws 3-D:

Campy performances, cheesy special effects, and downright awful dialogue all contribute to making Jaws 3 a truly dismal experience for just about everyone. It's not only hard to believe that a sequel this downright abominable didn't kill the franchise, but that it actually would be followed by a movie that was arguably worse—Jaws: the Revenge.

Amongst some flaws, some critics describe the film as "marginally entertaining." The sound design has been commended, however. The moment when an infant's cry is heard when the baby shark dies in the pool is particularly praised by one reviewer. Gossett, Jet magazine says, was the "only cast member to survive the generally negative reviews".

In her screenwriting textbook, Linda Aronson suggests that its protagonist, played by Quaid, is a major problem with the film. She says that after taking too long for him to be introduced, the character is "essentially a passive onlooker." There is no hunt until the climax when the shark is terrorizing the people in the aquarium; only then does Mike Brody become centre of the action. She also highlights inaccuracies in the plot. For instance, she refutes the idea of a "mother shark protecting her offspring [as] sharks do not mother their young," and points out that dolphins can attack sharks.

Leonard Maltin calls the film a "road-company Irwin Allen type-disaster film" and notes that its premise is similar to the 1955 sequel to Creature from the Black Lagoon.Jaws 3-D was nominated for five 1983 Golden Raspberry Awards, including Worst Picture, Director, Supporting Actor (Lou Gossett Jr.), Screenplay, and Newcomer (Cindy and Sandy, "The Shrieking Dolphins"), but received none.

Accolades

Home media
The film was released in a standard 2-D format on DVD by Universal on June 3, 2003 under the title, Jaws 3. With the exception of one theatrical trailer, no bonus features were included.

Universal Studios Home Entertainment released the Jaws series of films in HD on Blu-ray in 2016, including, Jaws 3-D on Blu-ray 3D.

See alsoRevenge of the Creature''
List of killer shark films

References

Further reading

External links

 
 
 
 
 

1983 3D films
1980s action thriller films
1980s adventure films
1980s horror thriller films
1983 directorial debut films
1983 films
1983 horror films
Alan Landsburg Productions films
American 3D films
American action thriller films
American adventure films
American horror thriller films
American natural horror films
American sequel films
1980s English-language films
Films about sharks
Films set in amusement parks
Films shot in Florida
Films set in Florida
Films set in Orlando, Florida
 3
Films with screenplays by Carl Gottlieb
Films with screenplays by Richard Matheson
SeaWorld Orlando
Universal Pictures films
Films about shark attacks
1980s American films